Muslim News Nigeria is a bi-monthly print and daily online Islamic newspaper in Nigeria.

History 
Muslim News Nigeria was founded by Rasheed Abubakar, an author, writer and a columnist with The Daily Independent in Lagos, Nigeria. It debuted in August 2018. It was established due to the media reportage of Barrister Firdaus Amasa's Hijab saga and several other cases of under-reporting of news about Islam and Muslims. In September 2018, Muslim News Nigeria went online with regular Muslim content and in-depth analyses of happenings around the Muslim world. Its website is fast becoming the most frequently visited Muslim news website by majority Muslims, and some non-Muslims.

References 

Nigerian news websites
2018 establishments in Nigeria
Islam in Nigeria